The 1983–84 County Championship was the 42nd season of the Liga IV, the fourth tier of the Romanian football league system. The champions of each county association play against one from a neighboring county in a play-off  to gain promotion to Divizia C.

Promotion play-off 
Teams promoted to Divizia C without a play-off matches as teams from less represented counties in the third division.

 (IS) Tepro Iași
 (CJ) Motorul IRA Cluj-Napoca
 (BN) Energia Prundu Bârgăului
 (VL) Forestierul Băbeni

 (VS) Unirea Negrești
 (BT) Luceafărul Botoșani
 (GR) Constructorul TCIAZ Giurgiu

 Ilfov County did not enter a team in the play-offs.

The matches was played on 8 and 15 July 1984.

County leagues

Arad County 
Seria A

Seria B

Championship final 

Motorul Arad won the 1983–84 Arad County Championship and qualify for promotion play-off in Divizia C.

Hunedoara County 
 Valea Jiului Series

 Valea Mureșului Series

Championship final 
The matches was played on 7 and 10 June 1984.

CFR Simeria won the 1983–84 Hunedoara County Championship and qualify for promotion play-off in Divizia C.

Maramureș County 
North Series

South Series

Championship final 
The championship final was played on 10 June 1984 at Comunal Stadium in Seini.

IS Sighetu Marmației won the 1983–84 Liga IV Maramureș County and qualify to promotion play-off in Divizia C.

Neamț County

See also 

 1983–84 Divizia A
 1983–84 Divizia B
 1983–84 Cupa României

References

External links
 

Liga IV seasons
4
Romania